Peter Austin may refer:
 Peter Austin (brewer) (1921–2014), British brewer
 Peter Austin (linguist), Australian linguist
 Peter Austin (journalist), editor of the Eastbourne Gazette and Eastbourne Herald
 Pete Austin, British game developer at Level 9 Computing